In celestial mechanics, a Kepler orbit (or Keplerian orbit, named after the German astronomer Johannes Kepler) is the motion of one body relative to another, as an ellipse, parabola, or hyperbola, which forms a two-dimensional orbital plane in three-dimensional space. A Kepler orbit can also form a straight line. It considers only the point-like gravitational attraction of two bodies, neglecting perturbations due to gravitational interactions with other objects, atmospheric drag, solar radiation pressure, a non-spherical central body, and so on. It is thus said to be a solution of a special case of the two-body problem, known as the Kepler problem. As a theory in classical mechanics, it also does not take into account the effects of general relativity. Keplerian orbits can be parametrized into six orbital elements in various ways..

In most applications, there is a large central body, the center of mass of which is assumed to be the center of mass of the entire system. By decomposition, the orbits of two objects of similar mass can be described as Kepler orbits around their common center of mass, their barycenter.

Introduction

From ancient times until the 16th and 17th centuries, the motions of the planets were believed to follow perfectly circular geocentric paths as taught by the ancient Greek philosophers Aristotle and Ptolemy. Variations in the motions of the planets were explained by smaller circular paths overlaid on the larger path (see epicycle). As measurements of the planets became increasingly accurate, revisions to the theory were proposed. In 1543, Nicolaus Copernicus published a heliocentric model of the Solar System, although he still believed that the planets traveled in perfectly circular paths centered on the Sun.

Development of the laws
In 1601, Johannes Kepler acquired the extensive, meticulous observations of the planets made by Tycho Brahe. Kepler would spend the next five years trying to fit the observations of the planet Mars to various curves. In 1609, Kepler published the first two of his three laws of planetary motion. The first law states:
The orbit of every planet is an ellipse with the sun at a focus.

More generally, the path of an object undergoing Keplerian motion may also follow a parabola or a hyperbola, which, along with ellipses, belong to a group of curves known as conic sections. Mathematically, the distance between a central body and an orbiting body can be expressed as:

where:
 is the distance
 is the semi-major axis, which defines the size of the orbit
 is the eccentricity, which defines the shape of the orbit
 is the true anomaly, which is the angle between the current position of the orbiting object and the location in the orbit at which it is closest to the central body (called the periapsis).
Alternately, the equation can be expressed as:

Where  is called the semi-latus rectum of the curve. This form of the equation is particularly useful when dealing with parabolic trajectories, for which the semi-major axis is infinite.

Despite developing these laws from observations, Kepler was never able to develop a theory to explain these motions.

Isaac Newton
Between 1665 and 1666, Isaac Newton developed several concepts related to motion, gravitation and differential calculus. However, these concepts were not published until 1687 in the Principia, in which he outlined his laws of motion and his law of universal gravitation. His second of his three laws of motion states:

The acceleration of a body is parallel and directly proportional to the net force acting on the body, is in the direction of the net force, and is inversely proportional to the mass of the body:

Where:
 is the force vector
 is the mass of the body on which the force is acting
 is the acceleration vector, the second time derivative of the position vector 

Strictly speaking, this form of the equation only applies to an object of constant mass, which holds true based on the simplifying assumptions made below.

Newton's law of gravitation states:

Every point mass attracts every other point mass by a force pointing along the line intersecting both points. The force is proportional to the product of the two masses and inversely proportional to the square of the distance between the point masses:

where:

  is the magnitude of the gravitational force between the two point masses
  is the gravitational constant
  is the mass of the first point mass
  is the mass of the second point mass
  is the distance between the two point masses

From the laws of motion and the law of universal gravitation, Newton was able to derive Kepler's laws, which are specific to orbital motion in astronomy. Since Kepler's laws were well-supported by observation data, this consistency provided strong support of the validity of Newton's generalized theory, and unified celestial and ordinary mechanics. These laws of motion formed the basis of modern celestial mechanics until Albert Einstein introduced the concepts of special and general relativity in the early 20th century. For most applications, Keplerian motion approximates the motions of planets and satellites to relatively high degrees of accuracy and is used extensively in astronomy and astrodynamics.

Simplified two body problem

To solve for the motion of an object in a two body system, two simplifying assumptions can be made:
 The bodies are spherically symmetric and can be treated as point masses.
 There are no external or internal forces acting upon the bodies other than their mutual gravitation.

The shapes of large celestial bodies are close to spheres. By symmetry, the net gravitational force attracting a mass point towards a homogeneous sphere must be directed towards its centre. The shell theorem (also proven by Isaac Newton) states that the magnitude of this force is the same as if all mass was concentrated in the middle of the sphere, even if the density of the sphere varies with depth (as it does for most celestial bodies). From this immediately follows that the attraction between two homogeneous spheres is as if both had its mass concentrated to its center.

Smaller objects, like asteroids or spacecraft often have a shape strongly deviating from a sphere. But the gravitational forces produced by these irregularities are generally small compared to the gravity of the central body. The difference between an irregular shape and a perfect sphere also diminishes with distances, and most orbital distances are very large when compared with the diameter of a small orbiting body. Thus for some applications, shape irregularity can be neglected without significant impact on accuracy. This effect is quite noticeable for artificial Earth satellites, especially those in low orbits.

Planets rotate at varying rates and thus may take a slightly oblate shape because of the centrifugal force. With such an oblate shape, the gravitational attraction will deviate somewhat from that of a homogeneous sphere.  At larger distances the effect of this oblateness becomes negligible. Planetary motions in the Solar System can be computed with sufficient precision if they are treated as point masses.

where  is the relative position vector of mass 1 with respect to mass 2, expressed as:

Dividing by their respective masses and subtracting the second equation from the first yields the equation of motion for the acceleration of the first object with respect to the second:

where  is the gravitational parameter and is equal to

In many applications, a third simplifying assumption can be made:
 When compared to the central body, the mass of the orbiting body is insignificant. Mathematically, m1 >> m2, so .
This assumption is not necessary to solve the simplified two body problem, but it simplifies calculations, particularly with Earth-orbiting satellites and planets orbiting the Sun. Even Jupiter's mass is less than the Sun's by a factor of 1047, which would constitute an error of 0.096% in the value of α. Notable exceptions include the Earth-Moon system (mass ratio of 81.3), the Pluto-Charon system (mass ratio of 8.9) and binary star systems.

Under these assumptions the differential equation for the two body case can be completely solved mathematically and the resulting orbit which follows Kepler's laws of planetary motion is called a "Kepler orbit". The orbits of all planets are to high accuracy Kepler orbits around the Sun. The small deviations are due to the much weaker gravitational attractions between the planets, and in the case of Mercury, due to general relativity. The orbits of the artificial satellites around the Earth are, with a fair approximation, Kepler orbits with small perturbations due to the gravitational attraction of the Sun, the Moon and the oblateness of the Earth. In high accuracy applications for which the equation of motion must be integrated numerically with all gravitational and non-gravitational forces (such as solar radiation pressure and atmospheric drag) being taken into account, the Kepler orbit concepts are of paramount importance and heavily used.

Keplerian elements

Any Keplerian trajectory can be defined by six parameters. The motion of an object moving in three-dimensional space is characterized by a position vector and a velocity vector. Each vector has three components, so the total number of values needed to define a trajectory through space is six. An orbit is generally defined by six elements (known as Keplerian elements) that can be computed from position and velocity, three of which have already been discussed. These elements are convenient in that of the six, five are unchanging for an unperturbed orbit (a stark contrast to two constantly changing vectors). The future location of an object within its orbit can be predicted and its new position and velocity can be easily obtained from the orbital elements.

Two define the size and shape of the trajectory:
Semimajor axis
Eccentricity

Three define the orientation of the orbital plane:
Inclination defines the angle between the orbital plane and the reference plane.
Longitude of the ascending node defines the angle between the reference direction and the upward crossing of the orbit on the reference plane (the ascending node).
Argument of periapsis defines the angle between the ascending node and the periapsis.

And finally:
True anomaly defines the position of the orbiting body along the trajectory, measured from periapsis.

They have been mentioned here for completeness, but are not required for the proofs below.

Mathematical solution of the differential equation above
For movement under any central force, i.e. a force parallel to r, the specific relative angular momentum  stays constant:

This implies the vector function is a plane curve.

Because the equation has symmetry around its origin, it is easier to solve in polar coordinates. However, it is important to note that equation refers to linear acceleration  as opposed to angular  or radial  acceleration. Therefore, one must be cautious when transforming the equation.
Introducing a cartesian coordinate system  and polar unit vectors  in the plane orthogonal to :

We can now rewrite the vector function  and its derivatives as:

(see "Vector calculus"). Substituting these into, we find:

This gives the non-ordinary polar differential equation:

In order to solve this equation, all time derivatives must be eliminated. This brings:

Taking the time derivative of  gets

The differential equation can be solved analytically by the variable substitution

Using the chain rule for differentiation gets:

with the general solution

Instead of using the constant of integration  explicitly one introduces the convention that the unit vectors  defining the coordinate system in the orbital plane are selected such that  takes the value zero and e is positive. This then means that  is zero at the point where  is maximal and therefore  is minimal. Defining the parameter p as  one has that

Alternate derivation
Another way to solve this equation without the use of polar differential equations is as follows:

It follows that

Now consider

(see Vector triple product). Notice that

Substituting these values into the previous equation gives:

Integrating both sides:

where c is a constant vector. Dotting this with r yields an interesting result:

Solving for r :

Notice that  are effectively the polar coordinates of the vector function.

This is the equation in polar coordinates for a conic section with origin in a focal point. The argument  is called "true anomaly".

Eccentricity Vector
Notice also that, since  is the angle between the position vector  and the integration constant , the vector  must be pointing in the direction of the periapsis of the orbit. We can then define the eccentricity vector associated with the orbit as:

Obviously, the eccentricity vector, having the same direction as the integration constant , also points to the direction of the periapsis of the orbit, and it has the magnitude of orbital eccentricity. This makes it very useful in orbit determination (OD) for the orbital elements of an orbit when a state vector [] or [] is known.

Properties of trajectory equation
For  this is a circle with radius p.

For  this is an ellipse with

For  this is a parabola with focal length 

For  this is a hyperbola with

The following image illustrates a circle (grey), an ellipse (red), a parabola (green) and a hyperbola (blue)

and for a parabola the range is

Using the chain rule for differentiation, the equation and the definition of p as  one gets that the radial velocity component is

and that the tangential component (velocity component perpendicular to ) is

The connection between the polar argument  and time t is slightly different for elliptic and hyperbolic orbits.

For an elliptic orbit one switches to the "eccentric anomaly" E for which

and consequently

and the angular momentum H is

Integrating with respect to time t gives

under the assumption that time  is selected such that the integration constant is zero.

As by definition of p one has

this can be written

For a hyperbolic orbit one uses the hyperbolic functions for the parameterisation

for which one has

and the angular momentum H is

Integrating with respect to time t gets

i.e.

To find what time t that corresponds to a certain true anomaly  one computes corresponding parameter E connected to time with relation for an elliptic and with relation for a hyperbolic orbit.

Note that the relations and  define a mapping between the ranges

Some additional formulae

and therefore that

From then follows that

One therefore has that

and that

where "" is the polar argument of the vector  and n is selected such that 

For the numerical computation of  the standard function ATAN2(y,x) (or in double precision DATAN2(y,x)) available in for example the programming language FORTRAN can be used.

Note that this is a mapping between the ranges

and therefore that

As

This relation is convenient for passing between "true anomaly" and the parameter E, the latter being connected to time through relation. Note that this is a mapping between the ranges

and that  can be computed using the relation

From relation follows that the orbital period P for an elliptic orbit is

As the potential energy corresponding to the force field of relation is 

for an elliptic orbit is

Relative the inertial coordinate system

The equation of the center relates mean anomaly to true anomaly for elliptical orbits, for small numerical eccentricity.

Determination of the Kepler orbit that corresponds to a given initial state

This is the "initial value problem" for the differential equation which is a first order equation for the 6-dimensional "state vector"  when written as

For any values for the initial "state vector"  the Kepler orbit corresponding
to the solution of this initial value problem can be found with the following algorithm:

Define the orthogonal unit vectors  through

From, and  follows that by setting

and by defining  and  such that

where

The standard inertially fixed coordinate system  in the orbital plane (with  directed from the centre of the homogeneous sphere to the pericentre) defining the orientation of the conical section (ellipse, parabola or hyperbola) can then be determined with the relation

Note that the relations and  has a singularity when  and

i.e.

which is the case that it is a circular orbit that is fitting the initial state

The osculating Kepler orbit

For any state vector  the Kepler orbit corresponding to this state can be computed with the algorithm defined above.

If now the equation of motion is

where

is a function other than

The Kepler orbit computed in this way having the same "state vector" as the solution to the "equation of motion" at time  is said to be "osculating" at this time.

This concept is for example useful in case

where

is a small "perturbing force" due to for example a faint gravitational pull from other celestial bodies. The parameters of the osculating Kepler orbit will then only slowly change and the osculating Kepler orbit is a good approximation to the real orbit for a considerable time period before and after the time of osculation.

This concept can also be useful for a rocket during powered flight as it then tells which Kepler orbit the rocket would continue in case the thrust is switched off.

From, and  follows that

i.e.  is a smooth differentiable function of the state vector  also if this state corresponds to a circular orbit.

See also 
 Two-body problem
 Kepler problem
 Kepler's laws of planetary motion
 Elliptic orbit
 Hyperbolic trajectory
 Parabolic trajectory
 Radial trajectory
 Orbit modeling

Citations

References

 El'Yasberg "Theory of flight of artificial earth satellites", Israel program for Scientific Translations (1967)

External links
 JAVA applet animating the orbit of a satellite in an elliptic Kepler orbit around the Earth with any value for semi-major axis and eccentricity.

Orbits
Johannes Kepler